Brahmachari Mogudu is a 1994 Telugu-language comedy film, produced by Battina Venkata Krishna Reddy under the Sri Sai Madhavi Arts banner and directed by Relangi Narasimha Rao. It stars Rajendra Prasad, Yamuna  and music composed by J. V. Raghavulu. The film was recorded as a flop at the box office.

Plot
Rambabu (Rajendra Prasad) is newly hired as a junior clerk-cum-typist in a private company headed by Kutumba Rao (Giri Babu) who hates bachelors because his sister has deceived by one among them. Hence he harasses Rambabu a lot by assigning him beneath the dignity of a graduates job. As it is his first job still under probation and no other vacancies, Rambabu is neither able to resign or able to get another job. One day his colleague Gurunadham (Brahmanandam) advises him to make a con before their boss that he is going to marry. So, he forges the wedding cards by randomly picking up a photograph of a girl and distributes them. After some time, as a flabbergast, the girl in the photograph Jayalakshmi (Yamuna) enters into his life claiming herself as his wife. Right now, Rambabu plans to get rid of her and plays various tricks but it misfires. The rest of the story is a humorous confusion drama that who is she?

Cast
Rajendra Prasad as Rambabu
Yamuna as Jayalakshmi
Satyanarayana as Madhavaiah
Giri Babu as Kutumba Rao
Brahmanandam as Gundubogula Gurunadham
Nagesh as Retired Army Colonel 
Dharmavarapu Subramanyam as Taxi Ramudu
Suthi Velu as Panthulu
Annapurna as Savitri
Srilakshmi as Kamakshi / Kamudu
Disco Shanthi as Rani
Annuja as Bhagyalakshmi
Dubbing Janaki as Shantamma
Kalpana Rai 
Y. Vijaya as Satya

Soundtrack

Music composed by J. V. Raghavulu. Lyrics were written by Bhuvana Chandra. Music released on AKASH Audio Company.

Other
 VCDs and DVDs on - SHALIMAR Video Company, Hyderabad

References

Films scored by J. V. Raghavulu
1990s Telugu-language films
Films directed by Relangi Narasimha Rao